International Non-Binary People's Day is observed each year on 14 July and is aimed at raising awareness and organising around the issues faced by non-binary people around the world. The day was first celebrated in 2012, started by Katje van Loon. The date was chosen for being precisely midway between International Men's Day and International Women's Day.

Most countries in the world do not recognize non-binary as a legal gender, meaning most self-identified non-binary people still have a passport matching their sex and official identification. Australia, Bangladesh, Canada, Denmark, Germany, the Netherlands and New Zealand include non-binary gender options on passports, and 23 US states plus Washington DC allow residents to mark their gender as 'X' on their driving licence.

Non-Binary Awareness Week is the week starting on the Monday preceding International Non-Binary People's Day on 14 July. This is an LGBTQ+ awareness period dedicated to those who do not identify with the traditional gender binary, i.e. those who do not exclusively identify as a man or a woman, or who may identify as both a man and a woman, or may identify outside of these categories altogether.

See also
Discrimination against non-binary people
List of LGBT awareness periods
Gender identity
Gender expression
Third-person pronoun
 International Women's Day, March 8
 International Men's Day, November 19

References

External links
10 ways to step up as an ally to non-binary people, Stonewall

July observances
Civil awareness days
Transgender events
LGBT-related observances
Non-binary gender